Belwood (Heurisko Pond) Water Aerodrome  is located on Heurisko Pond,  southwest of Belwood Ontario, Canada.

See also
 Belwood (Baird Field) Aerodrome
 Belwood (Ellen Field) Aerodrome
 Belwood (Wright Field) Aerodrome

References

Registered aerodromes in Ontario
Seaplane bases in Ontario
Centre Wellington